is an autobahn in Bavaria with a length of 276 km. It consists of two parts: one is a short track, from the A 8, near the Austrian border, to the Inntal Autobahn (A12) in Tyrol, Austria, the other from Hof A 72 in the north of Bavaria to Holledau A 9. A connection between the two parts was planned but not implemented. For a connection of the two tracks Bundesstraße B 15n is in construction and will be the foundation of the Autobahn A 93 later on.

Exit list 

 

  

 

  

 
 

 
 

 
 

  

 

|-
|colspan="3"|

|Austria
|}

External links 

093
A093